Mariinsko-Posadsky District  (Sĕntĕrvărri rayonĕ) is an administrative and municipal district (raion), one of the twenty-one in the Chuvash Republic, Russia. It is located in the northeast of the republic. Its administrative center is the town of Mariinsky Posad. Population:  26,959 (2002 Census);  The population of Mariinsky Posad accounts for 38.0% of the district's total population.

References

Notes

Sources

Weblinks 
 Сĕнтĕрвăрринчи Акатуй-2017

Districts of Chuvashia